Tyulen'i Islands is a group of about three very small islands in the south part of the Haswell Islands, located 1 nautical mile (1.9 km) off the mainland and 1.2 nautical miles (2.2 km) west of Mabus Point.

The islands are aligned east–west and lie just west of Stroiteley Islands.

History
The group was plotted by G.D. Blodgett (1955) from aerial photographs taken by U.S. Navy Operation Highjump (1946–47). It was photographed by the Soviet Antarctic Expedition (1956) and named Ostrova Tyulen'i (seal islands).

See also 
 List of antarctic and sub-antarctic islands
 Northern fur seal

References

Islands of Queen Mary Land